Kasispea is a village in Kuusalu Parish, Harju County in northern Estonia, on the territory of Lahemaa National Park. It's located on the Pärispea Peninsula.

References

Villages in Harju County